Seventeen TV is an online program which was broadcast periodically on Ustream. The program shows the South Korean K-pop boy group Seventeen before their official debut in the entertainment industry. In Seasons 4 and 5, it included concerts called "Like Seventeen".

Seasons
First season
The first official broadcast of TV Seventeen happened in January 2013 (however, in late 2012 they did a Christmas special). In the early part of this season, the names of the members who participated were not known, so they were called by nicknames according to something that they carried.

Second season
In the second season, the 11 members from the previous season continued, and 4 more were added: Seungcheol (S.Coups), Doyoon, Joshua, and Dongjin. This season, they began to prepare for the first Like Seventeen concert, and so were separated into teams that were differentiated by the color of the shirts they wore. Others took part in the performances, under the title of "Music Friends". They were fans chosen to partake in the concert.

Third season
Early in the third season, a new member, Jeonghan, joined. And after a while, Samuel left for undisclosed reasons. During this season, they participated in missions where the public voted for their favorite member via the official website, and the most voted would compose the "tracklist" for Like Seventeen 2.

Fourth season
This season continued with the same format as previously, i.e., missions and wishes for the formation of *Like Seventeen 3*. No member joined or left during the fourth season.

Fifth season
During the hiatus of Seventeen TV, Dongjin, Doyoon and Mingming all left the lineup (without stated reasons, but possibly a "secret trial" elimination); following this, new member The8 was introduced. Unlike other seasons, the fifth season started with a show, in order to display the evolution of the members' skills during the time gap. With only 7 episodes, two of them recorded shows, Seventeen officially closes the TV with a greater interaction with the fans, because for one hour of live they chatted with fans via Ustream's chat.

This season also had votes for the Like Seventeen 4, but was not based on missions, but only in the name of music.

Like Seventeen shows

References

External links
 

Seventeen (South Korean band)
2010s South Korean television series
South Korean reality television series